Carn Ban is a Neolithic chambered tomb located on the Isle of Arran in Scotland.

Description
It is on a steep south-west facing slope in a forest clearing partly covered in grass.

It is considered as one of the most famous of the Neolithic long cairns of south-west Scotland. It is of a type found across south-west Scotland known as a Clyde cairn. It is trapezoidal in shape, with a semicircular forecourt at the upper northeast end. The chamber of Carn Ban is 30 metres long and 18 metres broad. The tomb was excavated in the late 19th century, but the only finds were a flint flake, an unburnt fragment of human bone, and a pitchstone flake. The site has been designated a scheduled ancient monument by Historic Environment Scotland.

References

External links
Historic Environment Scotland: Visitor guide

Archaeological sites in North Ayrshire
Historic Scotland properties in North Ayrshire
Scheduled Ancient Monuments in North Ayrshire
Isle of Arran